Marion County is a county located in the coastal plain of the U.S. state of South Carolina. As of the 2020 census, its population was 29,183. Its county seat is Marion. It is a majority-minority county.

Early European traders in the Carolinas settled along the Pee Dee River from the 17th century, including in an isolated area called Sandy Bluff. They did business with numerous tribes, including the Choctaw and Chickasaw to the South. Crossed by several rivers, the county was organized by European Americans in 1785 soon after the American Revolutionary War and was originally known as Liberty County. However, four years later it was renamed as Marion County, in honor of Brigadier General Francis Marion, the famous "Swamp Fox" and a hero of the American Revolutionary War. In 1910, a portion of the county was taken to be organized as adjacent Dillon County.

Marion County is included in the Myrtle Beach-Conway–North Myrtle Beach, SC–NC Metropolitan Statistical Area.

Geography

National protected area
 Waccamaw National Wildlife Refuge (part)

State and local protected areas 
 Little Pee Dee Heritage Preserve
 Marsh Wildlife Management Area

Major water bodies 
 Cud Swamp
 Great Pee Dee River
 Lumber River
 Maidendown Swamp
 Waccamaw River

Adjacent counties
 Dillon County - north
 Horry County - east
 Georgetown County - south
 Williamsburg County - southwest
 Florence County - west

Major highways 

  (Concurrency with US 501)

Demographics

2020 census

As of the 2020 United States census, there were 29,183 people, 11,600 households, and 7,532 families residing in the county.

2010 census
As of the 2010 United States Census, there were 33,062 people, 13,058 households, and 8,881 families living in the county. The racial makeup of the county was 55.9% black or African American, 40.6% white, 0.5% Asian, 0.4% American Indian, 1.3% from other races, and 1.2% from two or more races. Those of Hispanic or Latino origin made up 2.4% of the population. In terms of ancestry, 7.8% were American, 6.3% were English, and 5.2% were Irish.

Of the 13,058 households, 33.4% had children under the age of 18 living with them, 38.0% were married couples living together, 24.9% had a female householder with no husband present, 32.0% were non-families, and 28.5% of all households were made up of individuals. The average household size was 2.52 and the average family size was 3.09. The median age was 39.9 years.

The median income for a household in the county was $30,629 and the median income for a family was $38,043. Males had a median income of $32,414 versus $24,929 for females. The per capita income for the county was $16,653. About 21.4% of families and 25.1% of the population were below the poverty line, including 36.8% of those under age 18 and 19.1% of those age 65 or over.

2000 census
As of the census of 2000, there were 35,466 people, 13,301 households, and 9,510 families living in the county.  The population density was 72 people per square mile (28/km2).  There were 15,143 housing units at an average density of 31 per square mile (12/km2).  The racial makeup of the county was 56.35% Black or African American, 41.69% White, 0.25% Native American, 0.28% Asian, 0.01% Pacific Islander, 0.90% from other races, and 0.52% from two or more races.  1.79% of the population were Hispanic or Latino of any race.

There were 13,301 households, out of which 32.20% had children under the age of 18 living with them, 43.30% were married couples living together, 23.60% had a female householder with no husband present, and 28.50% were non-families. 25.40% of all households were made up of individuals, and 9.70% had someone living alone who was 65 years of age or older.  The average household size was 2.64 and the average family size was 3.16.

In the county, the population was spread out, with 27.60% under the age of 18, 9.70% from 18 to 24, 26.80% from 25 to 44, 23.80% from 45 to 64, and 12.10% who were 65 years of age or older.  The median age was 35 years. For every 100 females there were 85.90 males.  For every 100 females age 18 and over, there were 80.40 males.

The median income for a household in the county was $26,526, and the median income for a family was $32,932. Males had a median income of $26,133 versus $18,392 for females. The per capita income for the county was $13,878.  About 18.90% of families and 23.20% of the population were below the poverty line, including 33.30% of those under age 18 and 23.50% of those age 65 or over.

According to the 2010 U.S. Religious Census, residents of Marion County are predominately Protestant. But the county had the highest concentration of followers of the Baháʼí Faith of any county in the United States, at 5.5%.

Government and politics

Communities

Cities
 Marion (county seat and largest city)
 Mullins

Towns
 Nichols
 Sellers

Census-designated places
 Centenary
 Daviston
 Rains
 Zion

Other unincorporated communities
 Ariel Crossroad
 Brittons Neck
 Friendship
 Gresham
 Temperance Hill

See also
 List of counties in South Carolina
 National Register of Historic Places listings in Marion County, South Carolina
 National Wildlife Refuge
 Chaloklowa Chickasaw, state-recognized group that resides in the county

References

Further reading

External links

 
 

 
1800 establishments in South Carolina
Populated places established in 1800
Black Belt (U.S. region)
Majority-minority counties in South Carolina